Motorsport Australia, formerly the Confederation of Australian Motor Sport (CAMS), is the nationally recognised governing and sanctioning body for four-wheeled motorsport in Australia. It is affiliated with the Federation Internationale de l'Automobile (FIA).

Responsibilities
Motorsport Australia has been the custodian of motor sport in Australia since 1953. It is the National Sporting Authority (ASN) for motorsport in Australia, recognised by Sport Australia, and is delegated this responsibility by the FIA. Motorsport Australia affiliated with the FIA in its own right in 1958 before being granted full membership in October of that year on a probationary basis.

In 1960, Motorsport Australia's membership of the FIA as an ASN was confirmed as permanent.

The FIA aims to ensure that motorsport is conducted in accordance with the highest standards of safety, fairness and social responsibility and Motorsport Australia, together with in excess of 120 other ASNs in over 100 nations, is committed to carrying out the mission of the FIA.

History
Motorsport Australia has been the custodian of motorsport in Australia since it was founded in 1953. The organisation is the Australian-delegated national sporting authority by the FIA, the governing body for world motorsport and the federation of the world's leading motoring organisations; a responsibility Motorsport Australia has held since 1958.

Motorsport Australia is also recognised by Sport Australia as the only National Sporting Organisation for four-wheeled motorsport in Australia.

As at January 2020, Motorsport Australia had approximately 95,000 members, in over 600 car clubs. It licenses more than 27,500 competitors and over 10,500 accredited officials. Motorsport Australia sanctions more than 3000 events per year from club level to International level.

On 1 January 2020, Motorsport Australia was formally adapted as the trading name for what was previously CAMS.

See also

Motorsport in Australia
List of Australian motor racing series
CAMS Rising Stars

References

External links

Auto racing organizations
Motorsport governing bodies in Australia
National sporting authorities of the FIA
Sports organizations established in 1953
1953 establishments in Australia
Organisations based in Melbourne